"One More Last Chance" is a song recorded by American country music singer Vince Gill. Gill co-wrote the song with Gary Nicholson.  It was released in July 1993 as the fourth single from his album, I Still Believe in You.  The song reached the top of the Billboard Hot Country Singles & Tracks (now Hot Country Songs) chart.

Music video
The music video was directed by John Lloyd Miller and premiered in mid-1993. In it, Gill, Belmont men's head basketball coach Rick Byrd, and various band members are seen playing a round of golf at a golf course, with Gill having ridden a John Deere tractor to the course. The video features a cameo by George Jones, who appears at the end of the video riding a John Deere riding mower to the golf course. The appearance echoes earlier incidents in Jones's life where he would ride his lawnmowers to go on beer runs because his wives would not let him drive a car.

Chart performance
The song debuted at number 61 on the Hot Country Singles & Tracks chart dated July 31, 1993. It charted for 20 weeks on that chart, and climbed to Number One on the chart dated October 9, 1993, and stayed there for one week.

Charts

Year-end charts

References

1993 singles
1992 songs
Vince Gill songs
Song recordings produced by Tony Brown (record producer)
Songs written by Vince Gill
MCA Records singles
Music videos directed by John Lloyd Miller
Songs written by Gary Nicholson